Amirteymour Kalali (5 October 1895 – 11 February 1988), also known as Sardar Nosrat, was a prominent Iranian statesman and aristocrat. He served as the minister of interior and minister of labour in the cabinet led by Prime Minister Mohammad Mosaddegh. He was a member of the Parliament of Iran for nine terms.

Habib Ladjevardi published his memoirs in 1997.

References

Further reading
Agheli, Bagher, Teymourtash Dar Sahneye-h Siasate-h Iran ("Teimurtash in the Political Arena of Iran") (Javeed: Tehran, 1371).
Ansari, Ali, Modern Iran Since 1921: The Pahlavis and After (Longman: London, 2003) .
'Alí Rizā Awsatí (عليرضا اوسطى), Iran in the Past Three Centuries (Irān dar Se Qarn-e Goz̲ashteh - ايران در سه قرن گذشته), Volumes 1 and 2 (Paktāb Publishing - انتشارات پاکتاب, Tehran, Iran, 2003).  (Vol. 1),  (Vol. 2).
Cronin, Stephanie, The Making of Modern Iran: State and Society Under Reza Shah (Routledge: London, 2003) .
Ghani, Cyrus, Iran and the Rise of Reza Shah: From Qajar Collapse to Pahlavi Power (I.B. Tauris: London, 2000). .

External links

1890s births
1988 deaths
National Front (Iran) politicians
Members of the 14th Iranian Majlis
People from Mashhad
Government ministers of Iran
Burials at Behesht-e Zahra
People educated at Harrow School
Qajar princes
École Spéciale Militaire de Saint-Cyr alumni